Haritalopha is a genus of moths of the family Erebidae. The genus was erected by George Hampson in 1895.

Species
Haritalopha biparticolor Hampson, 1895 Bhutan
Haritalopha indentalis (Wileman, 1915) Taiwan

References

Calpinae